Joe Kutchera (born 1970) is an American author, columnist and marketing executive.

While working at Grupo Expansion in Mexico City (acquired by Time Inc. in 2005), his team launched CNN Expansion, the leading Spanish-language business news site in North America (now Expansion.mx). Subsequently, Kutchera worked at Flipboard as its Head of LatAm Content + Publishers. Currently, he is the Founder and Managing Partner of the digital Hispanic/Latin American marketing and PR consultancy Latino Link Advisors.

In 2020, the City of Richmond's Office of Immigrant and Refugee Engagement (formerly the office of Multicultural Affairs) commissioned “Portraits of Immigrant Voices,” a digital art exhibition that explores the diversity of immigrant experiences in Richmond, Virginia with painted portraits of Alfonso Pérez Acosta and personal histories written by Joe Kutchera.

Kutchera has appeared on CNN en Español, ABC News and Authors@ Google.

Published works

Books
 Latino Link: Building Brands Online with Hispanic Communities and Content (Paramount Books)
 E-X-I-T-O: Su estrategía de marketing digital en 5 pasos (Editorial Patria/Hachette)
 Faces of a Fish Empire: A Visual History of Empire Fish Company and the Decline of Commercial Fishing in Wisconsin (self-published)

References

External links 
 Joe Kutchera Official Website

American business writers
American bloggers
1970 births
Living people
21st-century American non-fiction writers